Subi may refer to:

Subi Jacob George, Indian organic chemist
Subi language, a Bantu language of Tanzania
Subi Oval, a sports stadium in Perth, Western Australia
Subi Reef, in the South China Sea
Subi District, in Indonesia

See also
Subiaco (disambiguation)
Suebi, a large group of Germanic tribes